Sumovsky is a rural locality (a settlement) in Rakityansky District, Belgorod Oblast, Russia. The population was 101 as of 2010.

Geography 
Sumovsky is located 9 km southeast of Rakitnoye (the district's administrative centre) by road. Chistopolye is the nearest rural locality.

References 

Rural localities in Rakityansky District